Yazzie is a name, derived from the Navajo word   meaning "little" and may refer to:

 Yazzie Johnson (born 1946), Navajo jeweler living in northern New Mexico
 Aaron Yazzie (born 1986), Navajo mechanical engineer working at NASA's Jet Propulsion Laboratory
 Allan Yazzie, Navajo educational advocate
 Brian Yazzie, known as Yazzie the Chef, Navajo chef
 Jolene Yazzie (born 1978), Navajo graphic designer in Arizona
 Melanie Yazzie (born 1966), Navajo printmaker, sculptor, and professor in Colorado
 Rhiana Yazzie, Navajo playwright, actor, and filmmaker
 Sybil Yazzie (born c. 1917–1918), Navajo painter
 Steven Yazzie (born 1970), Native American artist
 Larry Yazzie, Navajo Sculptor

Native American surnames
Navajo language